Dordrecht Zuid is a railway station in the south of Dordrecht, Netherlands, located on the Breda–Rotterdam railway between Lage Zwaluwe and Dordrecht. Trains running between Den Haag Centraal, Roosendaal and Breda stop at this station. The current railway building was constructed in the early 1970s.

Train services
The following services call at Dordrecht Zuid:
2x per hour local service (sprinter) Dordrecht - Breda - Tilburg - 's-Hertogenbosch
2x per hour local service (sprinter) Dordrecht - Roosendaal

Bus services

The station is served by the following bus services, operated by Qbuzz:

External links
NS website 
Dutch Public Transport journey planner 

Zuid
Railway stations on the Staatslijn I